Gheorghe Tașcă (born Iorgu Tașcă, January 30, 1875 – March 25, 1951) was a Romanian economist, lawyer, academic, diplomat, and politician.  He was a corresponding member of the Romanian Academy.

After a distinguished career as jurist and professor at the Bucharest Academy of Economic Studies, ambassador to Germany, and Minister of Industry and Commerce, he became a victim of the Communist regime, dying at Sighet Prison.

Biography

Early days
Tașcă was born in Bălăbănești, Tutova County, now in Galați County. He was one of 12 children of Gheorghe I. Tașcă, a local landowner and philanthropist, and Maria, née Dabija, the daughter of the local priest. He studied from 1886 to 1995 at the Gheorghe Roșca Codreanu High School in Bârlad, after which he went to Bucharest to study at the Faculty of Law of the University of Bucharest, graduating in 1899 magna cum laude, with thesis "On the evolution of rural property in Romania". After being admitted to the bar of Ilfov County, he became a member of the Conservative Party and was elected  representative of Tutova County to the Chamber of Deputies. On December 8, 1905 he married Cordelia Demetriescu, the daughter of historian and writer Anghel Demetriescu. A year later their first daughter, Elisabeta, was born (she married in 1929 Eugen Filotti), while their second daughter, Georgeta, was born in 1908.

Academic career
In 1905 Tașcă went to Paris to pursue his studies at the Law School of the University of Paris; on May 28, 1907 he successfully defended his thesis, "La question agraire. Commentaire critique de la legislation rurale en Roumanie, Angleterre, Irlande, Allemagne", written under the direction of André Weiss. Upon returning to Bucharest, he applied for a position in the Political Economy department of the Faculty of Law; although Tașcă won the competition, his appointment was vetoed by Spiru Haret, the Minister of Education, on the theory that a law degree does not provide the necessary qualifications to teach Economics. In 1908 Tașcă returned to Paris, where he received in 1910 a second doctoral degree, this time in Economics, with thesis "Les nouvelles réformes agraires en Roumanie". 

Back in Romania, Tașcă applied again in 1912 and was offered an assistant professor position in political economy at the University of Bucharest. When the Central Powers occupied Bucharest in World War I, he took refuge in late 1916 in Moldavia; conscripted into the Romanian Army, he served as diplomatic courier between Iași and Saint Petersburg. Returning to his teaching at the end of the war, he was promoted to associate professor in 1921, and in 1925 to full professor, a position which he held until 1940. 

In 1925 he was elected corresponding member of the Romanian Academy. He was professor of political economy and rector (1929–1931) of the Academy of High Commercial and Industrial Studies of Bucharest (now the Bucharest Academy of Economic Studies).

Political career

In 1910 Tașcă followed Take Ionescu and joined the Conservative-Democratic Party, contributing to the development of its political platform. When the party was dissolved in 1922, he joined Nicolae Iorga's Democratic Nationalist Party, and was elected to the Chamber of Deputies in the 1926 elections. From 1927 to 1929 he was Editor in Chief of Iorga's magazine, Neamul Românesc. 

From May 1, 1930 to May 1, 1932 Tașcă was Romania's ambassador to Germany. From January 12 to June 5, 1932 he served as Minister of Industry and Commerce in the Iorga cabinet.

Last years
Tașcă was arrested on August 1, 1950 by the Communist authorities and incarcerated in the notorious Sighet Prison, Maramureș County in cell number 58. He died on March 25, 1951 after a harsh detention regime and was buried at the Paupers Cemetery in Sighetu Marmației, in a common grave.

Works

Decorations and awards

 Commander of the Order of the Crown (Romania)
 Grand Cross of the Order of the Lithuanian Grand Duke Gediminas

References

External links
 
 

 

1875 births
1951 deaths
People from Bălăbănești
Corresponding members of the Romanian Academy
Members of the Chamber of Deputies (Romania)
Romanian economists
Romanian landowners
Romanian farmers
Gheorghe Roşca Codreanu National College alumni
University of Bucharest alumni
National Peasants' Party politicians
20th-century Romanian politicians
Inmates of Sighet prison
Romanian people who died in prison custody
Commanders of the Order of the Crown (Romania)
Grand Crosses of the Order of the Lithuanian Grand Duke Gediminas
Members of the Romanian Academy of Sciences
Romanian Ministers of Industry and Commerce
Ambassadors of Romania to Germany
Conservative Party (Romania, 1880–1918) politicians
Academic staff of the University of Bucharest
Conservative-Democratic Party politicians
Democratic Nationalist Party (Romania) politicians